Pamela Ribon (born April 4, 1975) is an Academy Award-nominated American screenwriter, author, television writer, blogger and actress. She created and wrote the short film My Year of Dicks (2022), which was nominated for the 95th Academy Awards under the category Best Animated Short Film. In November 2014, she found a Barbie book from 2010 titled I Can be a Computer Engineer. She decried elements of the book where Barbie appeared to be reliant on male colleagues. Mattel has since ceased publishing the book. Also known as Pamie and Wonder Killer, she runs the website  pamie.com. She was one of the original recappers for Television Without Pity. Her commencement address for the 2019 College of Fine Arts graduating class of the University of Texas at Austin was praised by Texas Monthly.

Films and TV

Bibliography 
 Slam: The Next Jam! original comic series co-created with Veronica Fish (2018) Boom! Studios
 My Boyfriend is a Bear original graphic novel co-created with Cat Farris (2018) Oni Press
 Rick and Morty: "Summer's Eve", Issue #32, (2017) Oni Press
 Slam! original comic series co-created with Veronica Fish (2016) Boom! Studios
 Rick and Morty: "Ready Player Morty", Issue #11, (2016) Oni Press
 Notes to Boys (And Other Things I Shouldn't Share In Public)   (2014), memoir, Rare Bird Books
 True Tales of Lust and Love  (2014), anthology, "How I May Have Just Become the Newest Urban Legend"
 You Take It from Here  (2012), novel, Gallery Books, Simon & Schuster
 Going in Circles (2010), novel, Downtown Press, Simon & Schuster
 It's a Wonderful Lie: 26 Truths About Life in Your Twenties (2007), anthology, "I Can't Have Sex With You"
 Why Moms Are Weird (2006), novel,  Downtown Press, Simon & Schuster, developed into a sitcom for Watson Pond Productions, 20th Century Fox, and American Broadcasting Company, 2006. Developed into a sitcom for ABC Family, 2010–2011.
 Girls' Night Out (2006), anthology, "What Happens Next"
 Cold Feet (2005), anthology, "Sara King Goes Bad",  Downtown Press, Simon & Schuster
 Bookmark Now: Writing in Unreaderly Times (2005), anthology, "Look The Part"
 Why Girls Are Weird (2003), novel,  Downtown Press, Simon & Schuster, developed into a screenplay for Robert Cort Productions, 2003.

Theater 
 Letters Never Sent (2004–2005) Co-created with Liz Feldman (Official Selection for the 2005 US Comedy Arts Festival in Aspen, Colorado)
 Call Us Crazy: The Anne Heche Monologues (2001–2003): Underground Los Angeles comedy show that became an international scandal.  Ribon transformed the autobiography of Anne Heche into a parody of The Vagina Monologues.

Freelance writing 

 Weekly Columnist, "Webhead," Austin American-Statesman
 Television Without Pity—Recapper (known as "pamie"). Get Real, Ally McBeal, Young Americans, Real World: San Francisco, Popstars, Making the Band, The Sopranos, Gilmore Girls, Queer as Folk, Boomtown, Tarzan, Wonderfalls.

Anime writer/voice actor 

 City Hunter—Voice of Kaori for American Dub, ADV Films
 Lost Universe—Writer of American Dub, ADV Films
 Trouble Chocolate—Writer of American Dub, VIZ Media
 Project ARMS—Co-Writer of American Dub (episodes 27–52), VIZ Media

References

External links 
 
 
 Scalzi, John "Your Wednesday Author Interview: Pamela Ribon" "By The Way...," June 14, 2006.

1975 births
Living people
People from Bloomsburg, Pennsylvania
21st-century American novelists
American women novelists
American voice actresses
Animation screenwriters
Screenwriters from Texas
People from Katy, Texas
American women screenwriters
People from North Richland Hills, Texas
21st-century American women writers
Actresses from Pennsylvania
Screenwriters from Pennsylvania
Walt Disney Animation Studios people
University of Texas at Austin alumni
Sony Pictures Animation people